Romania competed at the 1984 Winter Olympics in Sarajevo, Yugoslavia.

Alpine skiing

Men

Women

Biathlon

Men

Men's 4 x 7.5 km relay

 1 A penalty loop of 150 metres had to be skied per missed target.
 2 One minute added per missed target.

Bobsleigh

Cross-country skiing

Women

Luge

Men

(Men's) doubles

Women

Speed skating

Men

References

 Official Olympic Reports 
 Olympic Winter Games 1984, full results by sports-reference.com

Nations at the 1984 Winter Olympics
1984
1984 in Romanian sport